RLB may refer to:

 Raiffeisenlandesbanken, co-operative banks in Austria
 Railroad Labor Board, arbitrated labor disputes in 1920s United States
 Rider Levett Bucknall, a British-based global construction company
 Reichsluftschutzbund, air raid protection organisation in Nazi Germany
 Rebecca Long-Bailey (born 1979), British politician